The 2020–21 season was Tottenham Hotspur's 29th season in the Premier League and 43rd successive season in the top division of the English football league system. After finishing in sixth place in the 2019–20 season, Tottenham entered the UEFA Europa League at the second qualifying round, reaching the last 16 in the competition before being eliminated by Dinamo Zagreb over two legs. In the FA Cup, Tottenham played three rounds, being knocked out by Everton in the fifth round.

In the league, Tottenham lost their first game at home to Everton, but then went on an unbeaten run into December, where at the time Tottenham were division leaders for four weeks. With an away loss to Liverpool, Tottenham's form dropped. José Mourinho had guided the club to reach the League Cup final facing Manchester City. However, because of the dropped form in the league, he was sacked along with his coaching staff on 19 April 2021, and replaced by former player Ryan Mason as interim head coach until this season ends. Mason's first game in-charge was a league home game against Southampton which Tottenham won. The next game was the League Cup final which the team lost 1–0.

Season squad

Transfers

Released

Loans in

Loans out

Transfers in

Transfers out

Overall transfer activity

Expenditure 
Summer:  £64,900,000

Winter:  £0

Total:  £64,900,000

Income 
Summer:  £12,000,000

Winter:  £0

Total:  £12,000,000

Net totals 
Summer:  £52,900,000

Winter:  £0

Total:  £52,900,000

Pre-season and friendlies

Competitions

Overview

Premier League

League table

Results summary

Results by round

Matches
The league fixtures were announced on 20 August 2020.

FA Cup

The third round draw took place on 30 November 2020 on the BBC with Robbie Savage selecting Tottenham to play away at Marine of the Northern Premier League Division One North West, the 8th tier of the football pyramid. The draw for the fourth and fifth round were made on 11 January, conducted by Peter Crouch.

EFL Cup

The draw for both the second and third round were confirmed on 6 September, live on Sky Sports by Phil Babb. On 21 September, Tottenham's third-round game against Leyton Orient was postponed due to multiple COVID-19 positive tests among the Leyton squad. On 25 September, the English Football League issued a statement saying that it "has determined that in line with Carabao Cup Rule 5.1, the Club [Leyton Orient] was unable to fulfil its obligations to complete the fixture by virtue of the Council’s order and shall therefore forfeit the tie" and that "in accordance with Carabao Cup Rules, Tottenham Hotspur have been awarded with a bye to progress to Round Four of the Carabao Cup", where they played Chelsea. The game finished 1–1, and went straight to a penalty shoot-out which Tottenham won 5–4 to progress into the next round. Tottenham won their quarter-final against Stoke City by a 3–1 scoreline to advance to the semi-finals. In the semi-finals, played over only one leg, Tottenham then beat 10-man Brentford 2–0 to progress to the final of the competition, which they lost 1–0 against Manchester City.

UEFA Europa League

Qualifying phase

The second qualifying round draw was made on 31 August. The draw for the third qualifying round was held on 1 September. The draw for the play-off round was held on 18 September.

Group stage

The group stage draw was held on 2 October 2020.

Knockout phase

Round of 32
The draw for the round of 32 was held on 14 December 2020.

Round of 16
The draw for the round of 16 was held on 26 February 2021. The order of legs was reversed after the original draw to avoid a scheduling conflict with the Arsenal v Olympiacos second leg in the same city on 18 March, as Arsenal were the domestic cup winners and given higher priority over Tottenham.

Statistics

Appearances

Goalscorers 

The list is sorted by shirt number when total goals are equal.

Hat-tricks

Own goals

Clean sheets
The list is sorted by shirt number when total clean sheets are equal.

See also
 2020–21 in English football
 List of Tottenham Hotspur F.C. seasons

References

External links

Tottenham Hotspur F.C. seasons
Tottenham Hotspur
Tottenham Hotspur
Tottenham
Tottenham